Evelyn Sanguinetti (née Pacino; born November 12, 1970) is an American lawyer and politician who served as the 47th lieutenant governor of Illinois from 2015 to 2019. She previously served on the Wheaton City Council. Sanguinetti announced her candidacy for the 2020 election in Illinois's 6th congressional district, challenging first-term Democratic incumbent Sean Casten, but dropped out on October 11, 2019.

Biography
Sanguinetti was born in Hialeah, Florida (near Miami) to a Cuban mother and Ecuadorian father. Sanguinetti's mother was a Cuban political refugee who was able to escape Cuba by way of Puerto Rico in the early 1960s before settling in the mainland United States. Sanguinetti's father immigrated to South Florida in 1966 with his mother and brothers and ultimately settled in Hialeah. Sanguinetti's mother and father married in 1970, and Sanguinetti was born on November 12, 1970, when her mother was only 15.  On her election, Sanguinetti became the first Hispanic Lieutenant Governor of Illinois as well as the first Latina Lieutenant Governor in the United States.

Early life and education
Growing up in extreme poverty, Sanguinetti relied on government assistance for food and housing. Her first language was Spanish. Sanguinetti struggled in school, but ultimately found her footing in music through the piano. Sanguinetti's first break came when she earned a place in the prestigious New World School of the Arts, a magnet school for the arts in Miami. There she learned to further develop her musical skills and focused on piano performance and voice. 
Sanguinetti went on to attend Florida International University (FIU) and earned a bachelor's degree in music. She attempted to further a career in music by auditioning into the Manhattan School of Music, the Peabody Institute, and Jacobs School of Music. Not receiving the reception that she had hoped for and not having the financial resources, Sanguinetti decided to pursue a career in the law. Sanguinetti attended John Marshall Law School in Chicago.
While in law school, Sanguinetti joined the Moot Court Executive Board and the John Marshall Law School Fair Housing Legal Clinic. She served as President of the Hispanic Student Association and the Fair Housing Association. Through her work at The John Marshall Law School Fair Housing Legal Clinic she was able to practice law pursuant to Illinois Supreme Court Rule 711, and represented victims of housing discrimination. While a student she successfully handled the first ever case at the Chicago Commission on Human Relations that established a precedent for discrimination based on source of income. McCutchen v. Robinson, CCHR No. 95-I-1-84.

Professional career
Sanguinetti graduated from The John Marshall Law School in 1998, and became a state Assistant Attorney General under during the tenure of then state Attorney General Jim Ryan. 
After leaving the Attorney General's office in 2003, Sanguinetti practiced law in Chicago at private law firms representing police officers and other first responders in the United States District Court for the Northern District of Illinois.
While practicing law, Sanguinetti went on to become an adjunct professor of law at John Marshall Law School.

Public service 
In 2007, Sanguinetti was diagnosed with multiple sclerosis after an accident on a municipal sidewalk in Wheaton, Illinois. In 2011, when Sanguinetti was able to regain her ability to walk for sustained periods of time, Sanguinetti decided to run for an At-Large position on the Wheaton City Council on a platform of infrastructure improvements and sidewalk maintenance.

Sanguinetti won the election and served on the Wheaton City Council until December 2014 when she resigned to become Illinois Lieutenant Governor. Her tenure was marked by renewed investment into the city's infrastructure and fiscal responsibility.

In October 2013, Sangunetti was selected to be the Lieutenant Governor running mate for Republican nominee Bruce Rauner. Sanguinetti won the Republican Primary in February 2014, and became the party's nominee for Lieutenant Governor. In November 2014 The ticket of Rauner and Sanguinetti defeated the Democrat ticket of Pat Quinn and Paul Vallas, and Sanguinetti was thus elected to be the 47th Lieutenant Governor of the State of Illinois.

Government consolidation
Illinois' Local Government Consolidation and Unfunded Mandates Task Force was created under  Executive Order 15-15, Sanguinetti chaired and oversaw this task force.

From the report the task force produced a number of its recommendations subsequently became law;

 PA 99-0353: Four-year moratorium on creating new local governments
 PA 100-106: Township consolidation reform: road and bridge district consolidation
 PA 100-107: Township consolidation reform: DuPage County consolidation expansion, coterminous township consolidation expansion, 126-mile township square mile consolidation limit removed, county form of government retention after abolishing townships
 PA 100-242: Unfunded mandate statewide cost of compliance estimates by DCEO
 PA 100-0465: Education unfunded mandate; driver's education third-party contracting and physical education

Illinois waterways
Sanguinetti, as Lieutenant Governor, chaired the Mississippi, Illinois, Wabash and Ohio Rivers Coordinating Councils. Sanguinetti took an active role in advocating Illinois' approach to the management and elimination of the Asian Carp invasive species population in Illinois waterways, while balancing the interests of Illinois' business, agriculture and shipping industries. Sanguinetti worked with the U.S. Army Corps of Engineers to help keep the invasive species out of Lake Michigan.

Military affairs
Illinois is home to three large military bases: Scott Air Force Base near Belleville; Rock Island Arsenal near Rock Island; and Naval Station Great Lakes near North Chicago. Sanguinetti chaired the  Military Economic Development Committee (formerly known as the Interagency Military Base Support and Economic Development Committee) which coordinates the State's activities on and to act as a communication center for issues relating to current and former military bases in the State of Illinois. Sanguinetti worked with the Illinois General Assembly to help re-institute the committee and expand its use to preserve economic development associated with Illinois' military bases.

Opioid epidemic
Sanguinetti chaired the Opioid Prevention and Intervention Task Force for the State of Illinois. One of the results of the Task Force was to make the opioid overdose reversal drug naloxone, commonly called Narcan, available without a prescription. The Task Force also led to the creation of the launched a 24-hour helpline  and website (www.helplineIL.org) for victims of the epidemic to find help. Sanguinetti worked to have two bills signed into law: SB 772 that requires physicians to use the Illinois Prescription Monitoring Program to guard against doctor shopping; and SB 336 to allow those prescribed addicted opioids for pain to exchange those prescriptions for medical cannabis.

Angel Investment Tax Credit for minority owned businesses
Sanguinetti led a bipartisan effort to revive the Angel Investment Tax Credit in Illinois which helps small minority owned businesses. Sanguinetti, who chaired the Governor's Rural Affairs Council, worked with several state legislators on this bill, including Sen. Chuck Weaver (R-37), Sen. Dale Fowler (R-59), Sen. Daniel Biss (D-9), Rep. Grant Wehrli (R-41), Rep. Carol Sente (D59), Rep. Jaime Andrade Jr. (D-40) and Rep. Elgie Sims (D-34).

Post elective office
In 2020, after leaving public office and briefly running for Congress, Sanguinetti became the Executive Director of Hope Fair Housing, a fair housing organization that was founded in 1968 with passage of the Federal Fair Housing Act and in the aftermath of the assassination of Dr. Martin Luther King, Jr. In 2022, Sanguinetti left her position as Executive Director to run for DuPage County Clerk.

Personal life
She is married with three children and resides in Wheaton, Illinois. In 2007 Sanguinetti was diagnosed with multiple sclerosis.

See also
 List of female lieutenant governors in the United States
 List of minority governors and lieutenant governors in the United States

References

External links
Profile at Ballotpedia

1970 births
21st-century American politicians
21st-century American women politicians
American politicians of Cuban descent
American politicians of Ecuadorian descent
Florida International University alumni
Hispanic and Latino American women in politics
Illinois city council members
Illinois Republicans
John Marshall Law School (Chicago) alumni
Lieutenant Governors of Illinois
Living people
People from Wheaton, Illinois
People with multiple sclerosis
Politicians from Miami
Women city councillors in Illinois
Hispanic and Latino American people in Illinois politics
Latino conservatism in the United States